The Amiens Spartiates are a French American football team based in Amiens.

The team plays in Ligue Élite de Football Américain (division 2).

Achievements
  Champion of France (Div.I) 2004, 2010, 2012
  Vice Champion of France (Div.I) 2005
  Champion of France (Div.II) 1997
  Junior Champion of France 1999, 2010, 2011

American football teams in France
1984 establishments in France
American football teams established in 1984
Sport in Amiens